The 1996 ECO summit was the fourth Economic Cooperation Organization summit, held between 14 and 15 May 1996 in Ashgabat, Turkmenistan.

Attending delegations
 President Burhanuddin Rabbani 
 President Heydar Aliyev 
 President Akbar Hashemi Rafsanjani  
 President Nursultan Nazarbaev 
 President Askar Akaev  
 President Farooq Ahmad Khan Leghari  
 Chairman Emomali Rahman 
 President Suleyman Demirel 
 President Saparmurad Niyazov 
 President Islam Karimov

References

External links

20th-century diplomatic conferences
1996 in Turkmenistan
1996 in international relations
1996 conferences
Economic Cooperation Organization summits
20th century in Ashgabat